The 2018–19 Austrian Basketball Bundesliga season, for sponsorships reasons named the Admiral Basketball Bundesliga (ABL), was the 73rd season of the first tier of basketball in Austria. ece Bulls Kapfenberg won its seventh domestic title.

Hayden Lescault of the Oberwart Gunners was named Most Valuable Player.

Teams

Vienna DC Timberwolves will make their debut in the ÖBL.

Regular season

Standings

Results

Play-offs
Quarterfinals were played in a best-of-three games format, semifinals in a 2–2–1 format and the final in a best-of-seven format 2–2–1–1–1.

Bracket

Quarterfinals
The team with the higher seed played game one and three (if necessary) at home.

|}

Semifinals
The team with the higher seed played game one, two and 5 (if necessary) at home.

|}

Finals
The team with the higher seed played game one, two and five (if necessary) at home.

|}

Austrian clubs in European competitions

Austrian clubs in international competitions

References

External links
Official website 

Österreichische Basketball Bundesliga seasons
Austrian
Lea